Casimir Ostoja Zagourski (in Polish Kazimierz Zagórski; 9 August 1883 – 10 January 1944) was a Polish pioneering photographer of Central African peoples and customs.

Life
Zagourski was born in Zhytomyr in 1883. He was a Pole, from the noble Clan of Ostoja. He served in the Imperial Russian Air Force until 1917, rising to the rank of colonel, and in the Polish military during 1920.

He emigrated from Europe in 1924 and settled in Léopoldville (Belgian Congo), gallicizing his name and opening a photographic studio. Between 1924 and his death he travelled widely in Central Africa, undertaking expeditions to photograph "disappearing" native African traditions in 1929, 1932, 1935 and 1937.

His albums and a postcard series collectively entitled L'Afrique qui disparaît! gained him considerable renown.

He died in Léopoldville in 1944.

Sources
 Krzysztof Pluskota. "Atelier Photo Cinématographique—C. Zagourski." In Christraud M. Geary, In and Out of Focus: Images from Central Africa, 1885-1960. London: Philip Wilson, 2002. . pp. 59–68.
 Christraud M. Geary. "The Image World of Casimir Zagourski." In In and Out of Focus: Images from Central Africa, 1885-1960. London: Philip Wilson, 2002. . pp. 69–79.
 Zagourski: Lost Africa. Skira, 2001. .
 Zagourski: Africa perduta. Skira, 2001. .

References

External links
Casimir Zagourski postcard collection in Yale University Library.
Holdings of Zagourski photographs in the Eliot Elisofon Photographic Archives at the National Museum of African Art.
Web gallery of Zagourski postcards.
 Photographs by Casimir Zagourski in digital library Polona

See also 

 Ostoja coat of arms
 Clan of Ostoja
 Marcin Szyszkowski

1883 births
1944 deaths
Military personnel from Zhytomyr
20th-century Polish nobility
Clan of Ostoja
Polish emigrants
Polish photographers
Russian military personnel of World War I